Rickshaw Boy or Camel Xiangzi is a novel by the Chinese author Lao She about the life of a fictional Beijing rickshaw man.  It is considered a classic of 20th-century Chinese literature.

History
Lao She began the novel in spring, 1936, and it was published in installments in the magazine Yuzhou feng ("Cosmic wind") beginning in January, 1937.
Lao She returned to China from the United States after the establishment of the People's Republic of China in 1949.  In an afterword dated September, 1954, included in the Foreign Languages Press edition of Rickshaw Boy, Lao She said that he had edited the manuscript ("taken out some of the coarser language and some unnecessary descriptions") and he expressed regret for the lack of hope expressed in the original edition.

In 1945, Evan King published an unauthorized translation of the novel. He cut, rearranged, rewrote, invented characters, and changed the ending. The girl student and One Pock Li are King's, not Lao She's. King also added considerable embellishment to the two seduction scenes. Despite the liberties taken, the book was a bestseller in the United States and a Book-of-the-Month club selection.

Characters

Main characters:

Xiangzi 
A strong young man, a rickshaw boy at the bottom of society. He hopes to get rich through labor and break away from the bottom of society. But his wishes kept failing, and in the end he fell into a lazy bastard.

Huniu 
The daughter of the rickshaw factory owner Fourth Master Liu,She looks ugly and lives like a man in her life. She fell in love with Xiangzi, and Huniu got drunk with Xiangzi and had sex with him. Later, Huniu lied that she was pregnant and asked Xiangzi to marry her.

Old Master Liu (Fourth Master Liu) 
The owner of the rickshaw factory, Huniu's father.In order to prevent his assets from being inherited by Xiangzi, he severed his relationship with Huniu before Huniu married Xiangzi.

Supporting characters:

Mr. Cao 
He is Xiangzi's employer and has helped Xiangzi many times.

Old man and Xiao Ma 
In Chapter 10, Xiangzi rescues the old man and Xiao Ma, an old rickshaw boy and his grandson. The experience of the old man made Xiangzi place hope in enjoying life.

Er Qiangzi 
Little Fuzi's father was also a rickshaw boy, but he was very lazy and sold Little Fuzi to an officer to live.

Little Fuzi 
The daughter of Er Qaingzi, Little Fuzi was abandoned by the officer and returned home. Due to family poverty, Little Fuzi was sold to a brothel by Er Qiangzi

Plot
Set in the 1920s, the novel's protagonist is an orphan peasant who lives in Beijing to earn a living. Xiangzi is a young, hardworking, well-built rickshaw puller who dreams of owning his own rickshaw. Just when he has earned enough to buy one, it is confiscated by warlord soldiers. As he leaves, he spots some camels captured by the soldiers. He takes the camels and escapes and later sells them, earning the nickname Camel. However, the cash Xiangzi obtains from this is not enough for him to buy another new rickshaw – providence decrees that he must toil once more. A police secret agent later extorts him into paying him his savings, leaving Xiangzi impoverished again. Left with no choice, Xiangzi returns to work for Old Master Liu, the boss of a thriving rickshaw rental company.

Although he tries to be honest and down to earth, Xiangzi finds himself entangled between Old Master Liu and his stout, manipulative daughter Tiger Girl, ten years his senior. Tiger Girl, who is carrying a torch for him, insists on marrying Xiangzi after pretending to be made pregnant by him. Her father disowns her and the couple live together, progressively made poor by her spendthrift ways. Later, Tiger Girl becomes pregnant by Xiangzi and grows even fatter as she awaits her delivery due her laziness and greediness for food.

When Tiger Girl dies during childbirth and Xiangzi's infant child is stillborn, Xiangzi is distraught. He later finds meaning in life again in a female neighbour, the meek and long-suffering Little Fuzi, who is forced into prostitution by her idle father. When Xiangzi has earned enough to redeem her from the brothel, he is devastated to find she has committed suicide.

Xiangzi once again met the old man who had helped before. The old man is no longer a rickshaw, and his grandson Xiao Ma is also dead. The communication between the old man and Xiangzi made Xiangzi completely lose confidence in life.

The harsh realities of life taught Xiangzi that decency and hard work have little meaning in this pragmatic, dog-eat-dog world. He becomes a lazy, degenerate and unscrupulous good-for-nothing, no different from those he looked down on early in his life, spending his days gambling, cheating and whoring.

Subject matter and themes
The major subject matter of Rickshaw Boy is the way in which the hero makes his living pulling a rickshaw, the options he faces and choices he makes, and especially the fundamental issues of whether to work independently or as a servant to a family, and whether to rent or own a rickshaw. It also describes a series of adventures he has and his interactions with a number of other characters.

Beijing -- "filthy, beautiful, decadent, bustling, chaotic, idle, lovable"—is important as a backdrop for the book.  "The only friend he had was this ancient city." (p. 31)

The book explores the intimate relationship between man and machine (the rickshaw), and the evolution of that relationship.  The relationship is both financial—requiring months and years of calculation to graduate from being a renter to being an owner—and physical. "His strength seemed to permeate every part of the rickshaw. . . . he was energetic, smooth in his motions, precise. He didn't appear to be in any hurry and yet he ran very fast . . . . " 

Another important theme that the book explores is the relationship between the characters’ development and their economic existence. As Xiangzi pulls a rickshaw, people say "He had a strong body, a patient disposition, ambition, yet he allowed people to treat him like a pig or a dog and he couldn't keep a job.” As his job depends on his personal wellbeing, as his economic status becomes more precarious, his life becomes much more at stake as well. "No matter how hard you work or how ambitious you are, you must not start a family, you must not get sick, and you must not make a single mistake!"  "If you avoid dying of starvation when young, good for you.  But it was almost impossible to avoid dying of starvation when old."

In addition, the novel explores elements of naturalism. The novel often presents controversial topics such as infant mortality, child labor, domestic abuse, etc. It also hints at Hu Niu’s father sleeping with her. (Wang 1995, 180)

Most importantly, the novel profoundly satirizes the cruelty of the old society and exposes its ugly face. Xiangzi's life was degenerating, which was not only his own sorrow, but also the sorrow of the times. The oppression of ordinary workers in the dark old society caused the distortion of human nature.

Finally, Isolation and individualism are some of the most important themes in the book. "His life might well be ruined by his own hands but he wasn't about to sacrifice anything for anybody.  He who works for himself knows how to destroy himself.  These are the two starting points of Individualism."

Historical significance
The characterization or point of view in Rickshaw Boy reflects the influence of Russian literature in China in general, and particularly on the way that influence was transferred to China by Lu Xun in stories such as The True Story of Ah Q and "Diary of a Madman".

The subject matter of Rickshaw Boy aligned with concerns of Chinese leftists and the Chinese Communist Party, but Lao She had never aligned himself with the left.  For instance, the final sentences read, "Handsome, ambitious, dreamer of fine dreams, selfish, individualistic sturdy, great Hsiang Tzu. No one knows how many funerals he marched in, and no one knows when or where he was able to get himself buried, that degenerate, selfish, unlucky offspring of society's diseased womb, a ghost caught in Individualism's blind alley."

Lao She went on to play a leading role in literary associations endorsed by the government, such as the All-China Federation of Literature and Art. According to the introductory section of the Foreign Languages Press (Beijing) English translation, "Before Liberation [Lao She] wrote many works of literature, including his best novel Camel Xiangzi (or Rickshaw Boy) to expose and denounce the old society.

In 1948, leftist critique Xu Jia lamented that Lao She intended to depict a sick society or bad luck that drove Xiangzi to his fate. The excessive depiction of sex and the negative implicit comments of Chinese society in Rickshaw Boy was the reason to make it popular in the United States. China was depicted as chaotic, corrupt, poor, and backward, which was exactly how foreigners liked to see it. By creating the character of Ruan Ming who is a dishonest, hypocritical revolutionary, the Chinese revolution may be discredited.

In 1950, Ba Ren indicated that “Lao She failed to depict the revolutionary potential of rickshaw pullers and charged that his novel expressed a “reactionary” attitude, which is the why the novel was not emphasized in literary histories and college textbooks in China between 1949 and the mid-1980s and why during this time new editions were expurgated, deleting the novel’s pessimistic conclusion, including Fuzi’s suicide, turning Ruan Ming into a positive or neutral character, and removing scatological language and description of “naturalistic” detail, mostly to do with sex”(6).

In 1955, Lao She claimed that Rickshaw Boy was to show sympathy for the working class and he did not mean to say that the source of hope in Rickshaw Boy was revolution. Lao She apologized for this and expressed gratitude to the Communist Party and Chairman Mao. However, the censorship established in the People’s Republic of China after the civil war required the changes to Lao She’s novel in terms of  the “negative image depiction”. The novel was not republished in its original version until 1982.

Lao She has high prestige in China regard his literary status and was named a "People's Artist" and "Great Master of Language". However, at the beginning of the cultural revolution he was severely persecuted. His 1932 novel Cat Country lampooned communism, and the Red Guards paraded him through the streets and beat him in public. Being humiliated both mentally and physically, he, according to the official record, committed suicide by drowning himself in Beijing's Taiping Lake in 1966.

English translations
Reynal & Hitchcock (New York) published an English translation by Evan King in 1945 under the English title Rickshaw Boy ("by Lau Shaw"). According to Jean M. James ("Note on the Text and the Translation" in the James edition), "King cut, rearrange, rewrote, invented characters, and changed the ending." King changed various aspects of the original story which include but aren’t limited to adding two characters, rearrangement of plot, and making the ending of the story a happy one. In order to create a happy ending pleasing to American audiences, the English translation has Xiangzi rescue Little Fuzi from the brothel.  Lao She had never agreed for these changes, but because there was no copyright agreement between China and the United States at the time, he could not prevent the spread of this version of the novel.

The first representative translation of the novel was by Jean M. James, published by the University of Hawaii Press in 1979 under the English title Rickshaw: the novel Lo-t'o Hsiang Tzu.  It is based on the 1949 edition.

Foreign Languages Press (Beijing) published an English translation by Shi Xiaojing (Lynette Shi) in 1988 under the English title Camel Xiangzi.

The most recent authoritative translation is Rickshaw Boy: A Novel (New York: Harper Perennial Modern Chinese Classics,  2010) by Howard Goldblatt. For this translation, Goldblatt went back to the 1939 first edition and consulted the 1941 edition.

Adaptations
The story was filmed as Rickshaw Boy (1982) directed by Zifeng Ling. Composed by Guo Wenjing to a libretto by Xu Ying, an opera based on the novel (Rickshaw Boy) was created at the National Centre for the Performing Arts (China) in June 2014.

Reviews & comments
Rickshaw Boy has received reviews not only from China but also from the world because of its English translations. The common public reviews from the readers and the society are divided into two points: Chinese social condition and literary language used by Lao she. Here are some comments selected from different review platforms such as Amazon, IMDb, etc. The review is not scholarly-reviewed and is for reference ONLY:

A realistic novel that reflects Chinese socio-political structure and portrait of common people 
"What I enjoyed most about it reading it was the fact that it took me well outside the usual realm of literary classics from America and Great Britain. Rickshaw Boy is a Chinese story and a successful portal into 1930s China. But it’s also a universal story of the hopelessness that extreme economic disparity breeds; this is a very relevant message in our world today."

“The book is an expose of social and colonic structure of China….projects vividly and objectively the life of the rickshaw poor.”

“The novel is a masterpiece on the lives of lower class resident in Beijing and a reflection of the pre-revolution era and the movie is an equally masterpiece in honestly showing every detail.”

“The pain reveals much about the reality of those who are trapped economically and can't find a reliable path to prosperity in spite of bitterly hard work. However, I think Lao She has embedded a message of hope within the despair, as there were lucky things that came to Xiangzi (his name means lucky) and even the hope of the key blessing that could have transformed him and that neighbour girl, Fuzi.”

The use of language 
"The language is Rickshaw Boy and is at the level that futures with simpleness. There is no great rhetoric use and out-of-ordinary words in the book. The use of vernacular language makes it accessible to readers, being one of the factors that Rickshaw Boy is so widely read."

"Rickshaw Boy is a quick and fairly easy read, with a very overt message."

Notes

References and further reading

 
 
 
Moran, T. (2021). Resignation Open Eyed: On the Novel Rickshaw Boy by Lao She. In A Companion to World Literature, K. Seigneurie (Ed.). https://doi.org/10.1002/9781118635193.ctwl0207

Chinese Republican era novels
1937 novels
Novels by Lao She
Chinese novels adapted into television series
20th-century Chinese novels
Chinese novels adapted into plays
Chinese novels adapted into films
Novels set in Beijing
Novels adapted into operas